Santa Evita is a 1995 novel by Argentine writer Tomás Eloy Martínez. It is the story of the corpse of Argentine political leader Eva Perón, the second wife of Argentine president Juan Perón. The book became a bestseller in Argentina and has been widely translated. It is estimated to have sold over 10 million copies worldwide, which makes it one of the best-selling books of all time.

Plot
In a blend of fact and fiction, the story tracks Argentine first lady Eva Perón's perfectly embalmed corpse after her death from cancer at age 33, including how it was seized by the Argentine Military, following the ouster of her husband in 1955. At that time, the corpse was considered a sacred relic, and while army officials wanted to keep it out of the hands of the Peronism political movement, they also considered the consequences of destroying it.

Reception
Michiko Kakutani of The New York Times wrote that since Eva Perón's life seems perfectly suited for the author's "hallucinatory brand of fiction", "it's a pity the novel isn't better. Although Mr. Martinez's narrative is enlivened by some magical and highly perverse set pieces, though it possesses moments that genuinely illuminate the bizarre intersection of history, gossip and legend, the novel as a whole feels leaden and earthbound. In the end, it gives the reader neither a visceral sense of Evita's life nor an understanding of the powerful hold she has exerted on her country's imagination."

TV adaptation
In 2022, it was adapted into a miniseries produced by Salma Hayek and starring Natalia Oreiro.

See also
 1995 in literature
 Argentine literature
 List of best-selling books

References

1995 novels
Argentine novels
Cultural depictions of Eva Perón
Spanish-language novels
Novels set in Buenos Aires